Hanna Chang may refer to:
 Han-na Chang, South Korean conductor and cellist
 Hanna Chang (tennis), American tennis player